Oisín Stack is an Irish actor. He played Kat Moon's long-lost son, Dermott Dolan, in the EastEnders spin-off series Kat and Alfie: Redwater and Elliot in Absentia.

Early life
Stack was born to an Irish father and French mother, and was brought up by his mother in Arklow, County Wicklow. At the age of 11, they moved to Bordeaux and 18 months later they moved to Chichester. Stack decided he wanted to be an actor at an early age but drama school in the United Kingdom was too expensive so he auditioned for French drama schools and got a place at the Paris Conservatoire.

Career
Stack's early acting career was based mainly in France, Spain and Chile. He appeared in the French crime comedy film The Family in 2013, and the 2014 remake of Rosemary's Baby, as well as a Russian production, Mata Hari. Stack signed up to a UK-Irish agent and a few months later, in March 2016, he was cast as Dermott Dolan in the EastEnders spin-off series Kat & Alfie: Redwater, two weeks before he started filming. This was Stack's first Irish television role and his first "villain" role, as usually plays "romantic" or "best friend" roles.

Filmography

References

External links
 

Year of birth missing (living people)
Living people
21st-century Irish male actors
Conservatoire de Paris alumni
Irish male film actors
Irish male television actors
Irish people of French descent
Male actors from County Wicklow